Knipe–Johnson Farm is a historic home and farm located in Upper Gwynedd Township, Montgomery County, Pennsylvania.  The property includes six contributing buildings that include: the farmhouse (c. 1840), the Pennsylvania bank barn (c. 1840), the stone springhouse (c. 1790), and three agricultural outbuildings dated to the 1940s.  The farmhouse is a two-story, two bay by two bay, stone dwelling with stone and concrete block additions. It has a vernacular Georgian style.

It was added to the National Register of Historic Places in 2000.

References

Farms on the National Register of Historic Places in Pennsylvania
Georgian architecture in Pennsylvania
Houses completed in 1840
Houses in Montgomery County, Pennsylvania
National Register of Historic Places in Montgomery County, Pennsylvania